Maple Ridge may refer to a location in North America:

Canada
Maple Ridge, British Columbia, a city in Metro Vancouver
Maple Ridge, Muskoka Municipal District in Lake of Bays, Ontario
Maple Ridge, Stormont, Dundas and Glengarry United Counties in North Dundas, Ontario
Maple Ridge, Edmonton, Alberta, a neighbourhood
Maple Ridge, Calgary, Alberta, a neighbourhood

United States
Maple Ridge, Michigan
Maple Ridge, Ohio
Maple Ridge, Oklahoma, a historic district in Tulsa

See also
Maple Ridge Township (disambiguation)
Maple Ridge Wind Farm, New York